Federalist No. 24 is an essay by Alexander Hamilton, the twenty-fourth of The Federalist Papers. It was published on December 19, 1787, under the pseudonym Publius, the name under which all The Federalist papers were published. It is titled "The Powers Necessary to the Common Defense Further Considered".

Summary 
The essay begins by describing one criticism that Publius has confronted regarding "the creation and direction of the national forces." The criticism is "that proper provision has not been made against the existence of standing armies in times of peace." Publius explains that a stranger to the plan for a new Union might understand it as requiring that standing armies be kept in times of peace, or that the Executive has unlimited power to direct the troops without any deference to the Legislature. But according to Publius, neither is true, but instead the power over the national forces lies solely within the Legislature because it consists of representatives of the people.  The Legislative power over the national forces is further limited because a specific provision "forbids the appropriation of money for the support of an army for any period longer than two years."

The essay then continues to discuss the necessity for maintaining the national forces.  Publius discusses the impending threat of both Britain and Spain, because of their strong maritime powers.  Even though an ocean separates America from the European powers, their presence in the West Indies should be taken very seriously.  Publius argues for Peace through strength, stating that only a strong national army and navy can help defend the Union from unwanted foreign influence.

References

External links 

 Text of The Federalist No. 24: congress.gov
 The Avalon Project, Yale University

24
1787 in American law
1787 essays
1787 in the United States